Banca Popolare di Bergamo S.p.A. is an Italian bank based in Bergamo, Lombardy. The bank is a wholly owned subsidiary of UBI Banca.

History
Banca Popolare di Bergamo was found in 1869.

Banca Popolare di Bergamo Group
In 1992, the bank merged with Credito Varesino which the bank was renamed as Banca Popolare di Bergamo – Credito Varesino. It was the first cooperative bank listed in Borsa Italiana. It also acquired Banca Popolare di Ancona as its subsidiary.

Banca Popolare di Bergamo (subsidiary)
In 2003, the bank merged with Banca Popolare Commercio e Industria to form Banche Popolari Unite. The retail network of BP Bergamo  was also re-incorporated as a new limited company (S.p.A., P.I.03034840169), while the parent company, BPU, remained as a cooperative society . In 2007, the bank became part of UBI Banca.

References

External links
 archive at Borsa Italiana 

Banks established in 1869
Italian companies established in 1869
Companies based in Bergamo
Former UBI Banca subsidiaries
Defunct cooperative banks of Italy